The 1952 Washington Huskies football team was an American football team that represented the University of Washington during the 1952 college football season. In its fifth season under head coach Howard Odell, the team compiled a 7–3 record, finished in third place in the Pacific Coast Conference, and outscored its opponents by a combined total of 248 to 201. Dick Sprague was the team captain.

Schedule

NFL Draft selections
Three University of Washington Huskies were selected in the 1953 NFL Draft, which lasted thirty rounds with 361 selections.

Quarterback Don Heinrich, a fifth-year senior, was selected in the 1952 NFL Draft (3rd round, 35th overall).

References

External links
 Game program: Washington vs. Washington State at Spokane – November 29, 1952

Washington
Washington Huskies football seasons
Washington Huskies football